Rosario del Carmen González Flores better known as Rosario Flores (born 4 November 1963) is a two-time Latin Grammy Award-winning Spanish singer.

She was born in Madrid, Spain, as the daughter of Antonio González ('El Pescaílla') and famous singer Lola Flores. She is the sister of singer Lolita Flores and singer-songwriter Antonio Flores. She has a daughter with her ex-boyfriend Carlos Orellana. Her second son, Pedro Antonio, was born on 21 January 2006, the same day as his grandmother Lola Flores. Rosario and Pedro Lazaga, her partner and father of her second son, met while filming Pedro Almodóvar's film Hable con ella in 2001.

Awards and nominations

Latin Grammy Awards
The Latin Grammy Awards are awarded annually by the Latin Academy of Recording Arts & Sciences in the United States. Flores has received two awards from seven nominations.

|-
|rowspan="1" scope="row"| 2000
|scope="row"| "Jugar a la Locura"
|scope="row"| Best Female Rock Vocal Performance
| 
|-
|rowspan="1" scope="row"| 2002
|scope="row"| Muchas Flores
|rowspan="5" scope="row"| Best Female Pop Vocal Album
| 
|-
|rowspan="1" scope="row"| 2004
|scope="row"| De Mil Colores
| 
|-
|rowspan="1" scope="row"| 2006
|scope="row"| Contigo Me Voy
| 
|-
|rowspan="1" scope="row"| 2008
|scope="row"| Parte de Mi
| 
|-
|rowspan="1" scope="row"| 2010
|scope="row"| Cuéntame
| 
|-
|rowspan="1" scope="row"| 2014
|scope="row"| Rosario
|scope="row"| Best Contemporary Pop Vocal Album
| 
|-

Discography 

De Ley (1992)
Siento (1995)
Mucho Por Vivir (1996)
Jugar a la Locura (1999)
Muchas Flores (2001)
De Mil Colores (2004)
Contigo Me Voy (2006)
Parte de Mí (2008)
Cuéntame (2009; soundtrack for the 11th season of Spanish TV series Cuéntame cómo pasó)
Raskatriski (2011)
Rosario (2013)
 Gloria a ti (2016)

Filmography

References

External links 
Official site

Review of Cuéntame (English)

1963 births
Living people
Latin Grammy Award winners
Actresses from Madrid
Feminist musicians
20th-century Spanish actresses
21st-century Spanish actresses
20th-century Spanish singers
21st-century Spanish singers
Romani actresses
Romani musicians
Romani singers
Singers from Madrid
Spanish film actresses
Spanish women singers
Spanish Romani people
Women in Latin music
Latin Grammy Lifetime Achievement Award winners